White Wives is an American punk rock band from Pittsburgh, Pennsylvania. The band, composed of members from other Pittsburgh bands including Anti-Flag, The Code, Dandelion Snow and American Armada, was created in the summer of 2010. The band released their first EP, Situationists EP, through Lock and Key Collective in February 2011, and followed up in June with their debut full-length, Happeners, released on Adeline Records.

Band members
Roger Lawrence Harvey - Lead vocals/guitar (2010–present)
Chris "#2" Barker - Lead vocals/guitar (2010–present)
Chris Head - Lead guitar (2010–present)
Tyler Kweder - Drums (2010–present)
Chris Stowe - Bass guitar (2011–present)
Josh Massie - Keys/trumpet (2011–present)

Discography

Albums 
Happeners (2011)

Singles/EPs 
Situationists EP (2011)
"Indian Summer" 7" (2011)
Live at 222 Ormsby (2012)
Howls for Sade (2013)
Self Titled 7" (2013)

References

Musical groups from Pittsburgh
Punk rock groups from Pennsylvania
Rock music supergroups